"The Sound of Goodbye" is a song written by Hugh Prestwood, and recorded by American country music artist Crystal Gayle.  It was released in October 1983 as the first single from her album Cage the Songbird.  The song was Gayle's  thirteenth number one country single as a solo artist.  The single went to number one for one week and spent a total of fourteen weeks on the country chart.

Charts

Weekly charts

Year-end charts

References
 

Songs about parting
1983 singles
1983 songs
Crystal Gayle songs
Songs written by Hugh Prestwood
Song recordings produced by Jimmy Bowen
Warner Records singles